The White Dress is a standalone murder mystery novel by Mignon G. Eberhart published by Random House in 1945. It was reprinted as a mass market paperback in July, 1976, by Popular Library, and again in 1997 by Thorndike Press.

External links 
The Unknown Quantity at Kirkus Reviews
The Unknown Quantity at Goodreads

1945 American novels
American mystery novels
American romance novels
Novels set in Miami
Random House books
Novels by Mignon G. Eberhart